The 1944 Bainbridge Naval Training Station Commodores football team represented the United States Naval Training Center Bainbridge, Maryland during the 1944 college football season. The team compiled a 10–0 record and was ranked No. 5 in the final AP Poll. Joe Maniaci was the team's head coach.

Bainbridge players took five of eleven spots on the Associated Press' All-Mid-Atlantic football team: end Ed Vandeweghe, guard Buster Ramsey, center Lou Sossamon, and backs Charlie Justice and Harvey Johnson. Justice led the team in both scoring (14 touchdowns for 84 points) and rushing (529 yards on 48 carries for an average of 11.0 yards per carry). Harry Hopp was the team's second leading rusher with 520 yards on 83 carries (6.3 yards per carry).

Schedule

References

Bainbridge
Bainbridge Commodores football seasons
College football undefeated seasons
Bainbridge Commodores football